O Lucky Man! is a 2009 Russian comedy film directed by Edouard Parri.

Plot
Slavik is an ordinary guy. At 26 he finds his life empty and uninteresting. Not having a decent job, he can not find himself a girl. Slavik loves extreme sports, and at some point he decides to just stand on the edge of the bridge.

But suddenly two men appear - Oleg Genrihovich and Konstantin Germanovich, who think that Slavik wants to commit suicide. They convince Slavik that suicide is not a way out of the situation. They suggest that he create a new biography for himself, which includes knowledge of foreign languages, the end of the Brainstone University and work in Italy.

With such data, he is employed by a large company as a regional director. He is offered to start a new prosperous life. And Slavik immediately has new problems.

It turns out that the "wizards" Oleg and Konstantin did not seem to wish Slavik happiness, but wanted him to die like a real man. He gets more trouble, and his new girlfriend Alice spends all the money she gets.

Slavik understands that this can not continue any longer, throws down his "fabulous" work and returns to his past life, taking with him his friend Morpheus from the virtual world. Now this life seems to be full of colors for them.

As a result, it turns out that the "old men" by way of a series of interesting adventures have led him to a romantic relationship with a normal girl.

Cast
Mikhail Tarabukin - Slavik Razbegayev
Polya Polyakova - Alisa Grace
Vladimir Menshov - Oleg Genrikhovich
Sergey Shakurov - Konstantin Germanovich
Vladimir Kristovsky - Morpheus
Maxim Konovalov - Thick
Aleksei Panin - Thin
Andrey Merzlikin - Sanya-Frigate
Igor Kovalenko - Aslan
Semyon Furman - Director Viktor Sergeevich
Vyacheslav Razbegaev - Agent Michael
Aleksandr Bashirov - Perelman
Sergey Veksler - Ramiz
Armen Dzhigarkhanyan - Grandfather Ramiz
Elena Labutina - Lena

References

External links

Russian comedy films
2009 comedy films
2009 films
2000s Russian-language films